The Men's 1993 European Amateur Boxing Championships were held in Bursa, Turkey from September 6 to September 12. The 30th edition of the normally bi-annual competition, in which 197 fighters from 32 countries participated this time, was organised by the European governing body for amateur boxing, EABA.

Medal winners

Medal table

External links
Results
EABA Boxing

Boxing Championships
European Amateur Boxing Championships
European 1993
Boxing
Sport in Bursa
September 1993 sports events in Turkey